Stock car racing events in the NASCAR Xfinity Series has been held at the Las Vegas Motor Speedway in Las Vegas, Nevada since the track's inauguration in 1997. Currently, the track holds two races, with the 300-mile (480 km) spring race being referred as the Alsco Uniforms 300 and the 301.5-mile (485 km) playoff race held in fall being named Alsco Uniforms 302 for sponsorship reasons (and increased distance in the latter).

History 
In 1997, with the inauguration of the track, Las Vegas Motor Speedway received a second-tier series date as a support to the Cup Series event. The race is usually held as one of the first five rounds in the series.

On March 8, 2017 it was announced that Las Vegas Motor Speedway, would get a second Cup date, a second Xfinity date, and a second Truck date. While the Fall Cup race and Truck race at New Hampshire Motor Speedway went there, Kentucky's date was moved to Las Vegas. The new date that Las Vegas Motor Speedway acquired from Kentucky Speedway became the final race of the regular season to replace the Overton's 300 at Chicagoland Speedway which moved to June. Due to anti-Buschwhacking rules, only Xfinity Series regulars competing for the championship points are permitted to race in the fall race.

In 2019, with the announcement of the track's September weekend going prime-time, the race became a Saturday night event. For 2022, to follow the Cup race at New Hampshire Motor Speedway (another SMI track), the fall race received an extra lap in the process to make the race close to 302 miles with the event being 301.5 miles/201 laps in length.

Past winners

2006, 2008, 2009, & 2019 Spring: Races extended due to NASCAR overtime.
2020 Spring: Race suspended on Saturday and finished on Sunday due to rain.

Multiple winners (drivers)

Multiple winners (teams)

Manufacturer wins

References

External links

1997 establishments in Nevada
NASCAR Xfinity Series races
 
Recurring sporting events established in 1997
Annual sporting events in the United States